Nesploy is a commune in the Loiret department in north-central France.

Geography 
The river Bézonde goes through the commune limits. The commune itself is located in the Orléanais agricultural region. Nearby municipalities are Combreux, Montbarrois, Saint-Loup-des-Vignes, and Fréville-du-Gâtinais.

History 
The area of this town has historically been located in the royal forest of the Duke of Orléans. Only one of four castles remain from the past.

Demographics 
As of 2018, the commune had a population of 363.

See also
Communes of the Loiret department

References

Communes of Loiret